A Date with the Future is an upcoming Chinese television series starring William Chan and Zhang Ruonan. It is based on the novel 'Shi Guang Ru Yue' (时光如约) by Xiao Lu(筱露). The series started filming on November 19, 2021, at Shenzhen and finished in April 2022.

Synopsis
During an earthquake rescue mission, firefighter Jin Shichuan (William Chan) made a 10-year promise to Xu Lai (Zhang Ruonan) in order to calm her down. Ten years later, Xu Lai returns as a journalist who is also a search dog trainer. Together with Jin Shichuan, who is now a fire station chief, they work together to fulfill that promise.

Cast

References

External links
 A Date with the Future on Weibo
 A Date with the Future on Douban

Television shows based on Chinese novels
2023 Chinese television series debuts
2023 Chinese television series endings